Christian Sebastia Almenar, better known as Christian Sebastia, was born on May 7 in Ciudad Guayana, Bolívar, Venezuela. He is a singer, musician, producer and composer. From 2006 to 2015, Christian was as Pastor in the Church of Jesus Christ, along with his wife Eukarys Sebastia. Christian has come to stand out as one of the most famous Christian singers and producers in the musical scene of the Christian community in Venezuela and is a contemporary proponent of Praise and Worship also called Gospel music.

Christian Sebastia was the first Venezuelan gospel artist to perform for three consecutive days in the main auditorium of Madison Square Garden in New York, before a crowd of 25,000 people accompanied by North American artists such as Martha Munizzi and Alvin Slaughter. Christian Sebastia is called in the artistic medium as "the Pastor of the Celebrities" and together with his wife Eukarys, they are pastoral counselors of couples and families of Hollywood. On November 15, 2020, Christian and his wife Eukarys were ordained as Ministers of the Word by the Christian Reformed Church in North America in Spring, Texas.

Biography 
Christian Sebastia is the first of 5 children of the marriage between Juan Pablo Sebastia and Aura Mercedes Sebastia. In 1969, after having finished their theological studies in Puerto Rico, they moved to Puerto Ordaz, Venezuela, where they began their missionary work.

In 1996 he married Eukarys Piña, with whom he has three children: Sabrina Sebastia (1999), Samantha Sebastia (2003) and Christian Sebastia Jr. (2005)

Career 

The first production where Christian Sebastia participated as a singer was "La Familia" a production of 10 songs made in 1986 and produced by his father, interpreting 2 songs.

Sebastia was featured in the "Nuevo Circo" of Caracas where he interpreted the songs before an audience of more than 9 thousand people, a year later he gained the recognition of the Christian hearing Protestant in Spanish through the Protestant Christian radio for the time, Radio TransMundial. But it was in 2003 with the album "En Ti" that projected his music career as an artist, composer and producer to the international scene, in 2004 he was the first Venezuelan singer to participate in the "Noche de Gala" of Expolit and the theme "Me Alegraré y Gozaré" of the album "En Ti" was included in the track 12 of the compilation musical performed by Expolit titled "Llamados para este tiempo" where he shared space with the most renowned Christian artists of the time. Christian has been uninterrupted exhibitor at Expolit for 14 years, the largest Latin-American exhibition of Christian music and literature in the Hispano-America.

In March of the year 2004, Christian presented for 6 consecutive nights in the Monumental of Valencia, Venezuela, with a daily attendance of more than 25 thousand people who sang next to Christian his best known songs.

Among some of the songs from the album includes, "En Ti", "'Me Alegraré y Gozaré'" and "'Me Alegraré y Gozaré'", he played at Madison Square Garden in New York on July 27 to 29 of the year 2006.In 2008, the "Tu Amor / Your Love" album was recorded live in front of more than 3 thousand people in the campus of the Church of Jesus Christ in Ciudad Guayana, Venezuela, this production had guests who participate in duets with Christian Sebastia, among which is "Tu Amor" and "Palabra del Señor" with Pastor and artist Marcos Witt, 5 times winner of Latin Grammy Awards, with a trajectory of more than 30 Years of career and more than 60 musical productions, "Tueres mi abrigo" with Pastor Juan Sebastia, his father, who has 11 musical productions and a well-known Christian artist in the 80's, "'Para darte la Gloria'" that is interpreted together with Jennifer Salinas.

In 2008 the music album "Tu Amor" it received the distinction of Mara de Oro as "Best Album of Christian Music of year 2008".

Later in 2011, he won this distinction in the category of "Best Production Manager Tour 25 Commemorative – Marcos Witt year 2011", for the production of the series of concerts that Witt gave in Venezuela (Puerto Ordaz, Barinas, Maracaibo and Caracas)

In 2013 Christian is becomes the Production Manager of Monica Rodriguez singer and first Venezuelan woman to win the Latin Grammy Awards. In 2014 Christian is awarded by the organization of Mara de Oro as "Best Production Manager Tour Monica Rodriguez - Ecuador, Venezuela, Mexico and the United States of the year 2014"

In May of the year 2018 the album "Tengo Fe" was released. This Christian musical production has the participation of guest stars, who performed together with Christian Sebastia songs like: "Tu Amor" with Ilan Chester, "Nunca Pude Imaginar" with Mariaca Semprún, "Jesús La Razón" with Luis Fernando Borjas vocalist of Guaco (band), "A ti Me Rindo" with Gabriela Cartulano, nominated for the best Christian album in the edition of the Latin Grammys of the year 2017, "Principe de Paz" with Clayton Uehara among others. Produced by the record label Carismah Studios and CA Entertainment Group.

On Friday, April 5, 2019, the album "Tengo Fe" is nominated for the XV edition of the awards of the National Academy of Music and Christian Arts (Arpa Awards) in three categories: "Best Pop / Fusion Album", "Best Song in Performance (Principe de Paz - feat Clayton Uehara)" and "Best producer."

Discography
 La Familia
 En Ti 
 Llamados para este tiempo 
 Tu Amor 
 2013 eXplosion 
 Tengo Fe 

 Awards and nominations 
 Mara de Oro Award "Tu Amor as Best Album of Christian Music of year 2008"
 Mara de Oro Award "Best Production Manager Tour 25 Commemorative – Marcos Witt year 2011"
 Mara de Oro Award  "Best Production Manager Tour Monica Rodriguez - Ecuador, Venezuela, Mexico and the United States'' of the year 2014"
Nominated for the XV edition of the ARPA awards for "Best Album Pop / Fusion 2019"
Nominated for the XV edition of the ARPA awards for the "Best Song in Performance 2019 (Principe de Paz - f.e.a.t. Clayton Uehara)"
Nominated for the XV edition of the ARPA awards for "Best Producer 2019"

References

External links 

 Official Website of Christian Sebastia

Venezuelan musicians
Venezuelan religious leaders
Protestant religious leaders
Venezuelan record producers
Gospel singers
1974 births
Living people